The Rapa River ( and ) is a tributary of the Lesser Lule River in north Norrland, in Norrbotten County, Sweden. The river stretches 75 km from its source to the mouth of Lake Tjaktjajaure (477 amsl). At the mouth of Lake Laitaure (Laidaure), slightly higher up, the Rapa River forms the Laitaure Delta. The river flows through the Rapa Valley, finally joining the Lule River.

References

Lule River basin
Sarek National Park
Rivers of Norrbotten County